Mađare is a village in the municipality of Preševo, Serbia. According to the 2002 census, the village has a population of 174 people. Of these, 49 (28,16 %) were ethnic Albanians, and 125 (71,83 %) others.

References

Populated places in Pčinja District
Albanian communities in Serbia